Nebria banksi is a metal coloured species of ground beetle in the Nebriinae family that can be found in North Korea and Russia.

References

banksi
Beetles described in 1871
Beetles of Asia